Going for Broke is a 1977 Danish comedy film directed by Gabriel Axel and starring Preben Kaas.

Cast
 Preben Kaas - Arthur Gabrielsen
 Dirch Passer - Alfred Emanuelsen
 Jørgen Ryg - Hugo
 Lily Broberg - Fru Svendsen
 Peter Steen - Betjenten
 Elin Reimer - Emma
 Johannes Marott - Johannes
 Birger Jensen - Hr. Hoppe
 Ghita Nørby - Skuespilleren
 Henning Rohde - Portner
 Berrit Kvorning - Tullepigen
 Torben Jetsmark - Nullermanden
 Søren Rode - Betjent
 Torben Jensen - Skorstensfejeren
 Gabriel Axel - Fransktalende mand
 Rumle Hammerich - Mand der læser på toilettet
 Søren Strømberg - Mand der ikke vil betale for toiletbesøget
 Holger Vistisen - Mand der får maling i hovedet
 Esper Hagen - Mand der sidder fast i fiskesnøre
 Tommy Kenter - TV-reporter

External links

1977 films
1970s Danish-language films
1977 comedy films
Films directed by Gabriel Axel
Danish comedy films